Sir Maurice Shock (15 April 1926 – 7 July 2018) was a British university administrator and educationalist.

Shock was educated at King Edward's School, Birmingham and later read philosophy, politics and economics (PPE) at Balliol College, Oxford, where he obtained a first-class degree.

During his early career, Shock worked for British intelligence. After graduating he had a period of research at St Antony's College, Oxford and temporary posts at Christ Church, Oxford and at Trinity College, Oxford. He was one of the team of assistants to Sir Winston Churchill in the writing of his histories. He was the Politics Fellow (1956–77) and Estates Bursar (1958–73) of University College, Oxford, and was later made an Honorary Fellow of the college in 1985.

His academic publications include The Liberal Tradition: From Fox to Keynes (co-edited with Alan Bullock, 1967) and related works.

Shock served as vice-chancellor of the University of Leicester from 1977 to 1987, and was chairman of the Committee of Vice-Chancellors and Principals for two years. He then became Rector of Lincoln College, Oxford until retiring in 1994. He was a member of the UK General Medical Council from 1989 to 1999. The Maurice Shock Building for Medical Sciences at the University of Leicester is named after him.

He died on 7 July 2018, aged 92.

References

External links
Portrait by Bryan Organ

1926 births
2018 deaths
People educated at King Edward VI Aston School
British educational theorists
English political scientists
Fellows of University College, Oxford
Vice-Chancellors of the University of Leicester
Rectors of Lincoln College, Oxford
Knights Bachelor